Performers College is an independent, co-educational college specialising in performing arts.  It is based in Corringham, Essex, England.

Overview
Performers College is an independent college, providing vocational training in dance and musical theatre.  Key areas of study include ballet, tap, jazz and contemporary dance, singing and drama.  The college operates a three year professional vocational course leading to the National Diploma in Professional Musical Theatre, a further education qualification validated by Trinity College, London and placed at Level 6 on the National Qualifications Framework.
The college also offers a 3 year degree course validated by Chichester University.

Performers College has a history of feeding artists into West End theatre, dance companies and other areas of the entertainments industry.  It is one of 21 schools selected to allocate Dance and Drama Awards, a government funded scholarship scheme to subsidise the cost of professional dance, drama and musical theatre training at leading institutions.

The college is an approved centre for the Imperial Society of Teachers of Dancing and is authorised to offer nationally recognised qualifications in dance teaching.  The college is accredited to the Council for Dance Education & Training and is inspected by Ofsted as part of its role as a provider of Dance and Drama Awards.

In 2019 Performers College became part of BIMM Institute.

In 2021 Performers College announced that they will be opening a second campus in Birmingham.

Notable graduates
Clara Beuchamp, cast member of the West End production of The Sound of Music.
Aimee Lewis, cast member of the West End production of Wicked.
Gary Wood, the leading role of Paul in the West End revival of A Chorus Line at the London Palladium.
Dominic Shaw, dance captain for the West End production of Hairspray.
Dougie Mills, cast member of Tap Dogs and founder of Tap Core.
Grant Thresh, cast member of the touring company of Wicked.
Kyle Seeley, cast member of the West End Production of The Bodyguard Musical / Dance Captain Swing Original West End cast of Memphis Musical
Lauren Hampton, 2nd cover of Sophie and dance captain of the West End production of Mamma Mia.
Joe Pegram, cast member of Eastenders on BBC One.

See also
Imperial Society of Teachers of Dancing.
Dance and Drama Awards.
Trinity College, London.

References

External links
 Performers College - Official Website

Schools of the performing arts in the United Kingdom
Dance schools in the United Kingdom
Drama schools in the United Kingdom